Delphinium hansenii is a species of larkspur known by the common names Eldorado larkspur and Hansen's delphinium. It is endemic to California, where it grows in mountains, valleys, and desert from the southern Cascade Range to the Mojave Desert. This wildflower usually grows between one half and one meter in height, although it can grow much taller. The deeply lobed leaves are hairy, especially on the undersides. The inflorescence has usually over 25 flowers grouped close together at the top of the stem and held on long pedicels. The flowers are white to light blue or light pink, or bicolored, and vary in size. The inner petals may be quite hairy.

External links
Jepson Manual Treatment
Photo gallery

hansenii
Endemic flora of California
Flora without expected TNC conservation status